Mweya is a location in the Western Region of Uganda.

Location
Mweya is located in Kasese District, Rwenzururu sub-region, Western Uganda. It lies within Queen Elizabeth National Park, the most visited of Uganda's national parks. This location is on the northeastern shores of Lake Edward at the point where the Kazinga Channel joins the lake. The coordinates of Mweya are:00°11'40.0"S 29°53'57.0"E (Latitude:-0.194444; Longitude:29.899167).

Overview
Mweya is the most visited location in Queen Elizabeth National Park, due to the amenities and facilities clustered close to its location, including Mweya Airport, accommodation facilities, access to Lake Edward and Kazinga Channel, and abundant game, on land, in the water, and in the air. The topography, fauna, and flora around Mweya in the northern sector of the national park, differs significantly from that in the southern sector (also known as the Ishasha sector).

Points of interest
The following points of interests lie in Mweya or near its edges:
1. The headquarters of Queen Elizabeth National Park 2. Mweya Airport - A civilian airport located at Mweya 3. Lake Edward - A freshwater lake in the Western Rift Valley. 5. The International border between Uganda and the Democratic Republic of the Congo runs through the middle of Lake Edward.

External links
 Queen Elizabeth National Park
 Kasese District Information Portal

References

Populated places in Western Region, Uganda
Cities in the Great Rift Valley
Kasese District